Magdy Conyd (born 22 June 1939) is an Egyptian-Canadian fencer. He competed at the 1968 and 1972 Summer Olympics.

References

External links
 

1939 births
Living people
Egyptian male épée fencers
Egyptian male foil fencers
Canadian male épée fencers
Canadian male foil fencers
Olympic fencers of Canada
Fencers at the 1968 Summer Olympics
Fencers at the 1972 Summer Olympics
Sportspeople from Alexandria
Sportspeople from Vancouver
Commonwealth Games medallists in fencing
Commonwealth Games bronze medallists for Canada
Fencers at the 1970 British Commonwealth Games
Fencing coaches
Naturalized citizens of Canada
Egyptian emigrants to Canada
Medallists at the 1970 British Commonwealth Games